Hassan Bosso (born 10 September 1969) is a retired Nigerian sprinter.

Bosso finished fifth in 4 x 400 metres relay at the 1992 Summer Olympics with teammates Emmanuel Okoli, Sunday Bada and Udeme Ekpeyong.

References

External links

1969 births
Living people
Nigerian male sprinters
Athletes (track and field) at the 1992 Summer Olympics
Olympic athletes of Nigeria